Balding is a surname. Notable people with the surname include:

 Adam Balding (born 1979), English rugby union player
 Al Balding (1924–2006), Canadian golfer
 Clare Balding (born 1971), BBC sports presenter and journalist
 David Balding, Australian statistician
 Gerald Balding (disambiguation), several people
 Ian Balding (born 1938), American horse trainer
 Rebecca Balding (1955–2022), American actress
 Toby Balding (1936–2014), British racehorse trainer